Lloyd Herbert Shinners (September 22, 1918 – February 16, 1971) was a Canadian-American botanist and professor, known as an expert on the flora of Texas and Wisconsin.

Early life
Shinners was born in Bluesky, Alberta on September 22, 1918. His family moved to Milwaukee, Wisconsin when he was five, and he went on to graduate valedictorian from Lincoln High School. He continued his education at the University of Wisconsin–Madison, where he earned a Ph.D. under Norman Carter Fassett in 1943. He worked for the town of Milwaukee before moving to Dallas, Texas in 1945.

Career
Shinners worked for the Southern Methodist University as a research assistant, before being placed in charge of the university's herbarium. In 1960, he attained a full professorship. Through his guidance, the herbarium grew from 20,000 specimens to over 340,000. He was specifically interested in the Compositae.

Publications
Shinners authored 274 articles, and published a comprehensive 514 page Flora of north-central Texas.

Eponyms
Shinners was the namesake of one genus, Shinnersia, and more than 15 species, including:
Thelypodiopsis shinnersii (M.C.Johnst.) Rollins
Ipomoea shinnersii D.F.Austin
Carex shinnersii P.Rothr. & Reznicek

Legacy
Shinner's library of botanical books and collection of plant specimens formed the initial collections of the Botanical Research Institute of Texas in Fort Worth when it was founded in 1987.

References

Further reading

Botanists with author abbreviations
20th-century Canadian botanists
1918 births
1971 deaths
University of Wisconsin–Madison alumni
Southern Methodist University faculty
Canadian emigrants to the United States
20th-century American botanists